Ghotuo (also Otwa, Otuo) is an Edoid language spoken in Edo State, mostly in the Owan and Akoko-Edo areas of Edo state, Nigeria.

References

Edoid languages